Victoria Benedictsson (March 6, 1850 in Domme – July 21, 1888) was a Swedish author. She was born as Victoria Maria Bruzelius in Domme, a village in the province of Skåne. She wrote under the pen name Ernst Ahlgren. Notable works include Pengar (1885) and Fru Marianne (1887).

Biography
Benedictsson grew up on a farm in Sweden. At 21 she married a 49-year-old widower from Hörby. After an illness left her bed-bound, Benedictsson turned to writing, publishing her first collection of stories, Från Skåne, in 1884. She is, together with August Strindberg, regarded as one of the greatest proponents of the Swedish realist writing style. In her novels she described the inequality of marriage and often debated women's rights issues in her writings. Current critics see her as an early feminist; earlier the focus was on her love affair with Georg Brandes. She also wrote plays one of which was entitled I Telefon (Swedish: On Telephone) which was performed
twenty-seven times at the Royal Dramatic Theatre in Stockholm gaining a big success. Then the play was serialized in Familie Journalen in 1887. 

She committed suicide in room No. 17 in Leopold's Hotel on Hovedvagtsgade – near Kongens Nytorv in Copenhagen. She is buried in city's Western Cemetery.

References

Further reading

External links

 
 
 
 Victoria Lives! Columbia University conference, March 10–11, 2000, on the occasion of her 150th birthday

1850 births
1888 deaths
People from Trelleborg Municipality
Swedish-language writers
Swedish expatriates in Denmark
Suicides by sharp instrument in Denmark
Pseudonymous women writers
19th-century Swedish women writers
19th-century Swedish dramatists and playwrights
1880s suicides
19th-century pseudonymous writers
Swedish women dramatists and playwrights
Burials at Vestre Cemetery, Copenhagen